Skylark (also titled Skylark: The Sequel to Sarah, Plain and Tall) is a 1993 Hallmark Hall of Fame made-for-television drama film and is a sequel to Sarah, Plain and Tall (1991).

Plot
The Witting farm is in trouble from a severe drought. Jacob and Sarah begin to wonder what will happen to the family if they have to leave the farm. Sarah decides to take Anna and Caleb to her hometown in Maine while Jacob stays at the farm to make sure it is safe and sound. When the family arrives in Maine, Anna and Caleb meet Sarah's family who completely fall in love with them. It is also there that Sarah reveals that she is pregnant.

Cast
 Glenn Close as Sarah Witting
 Christopher Walken as Jacob Witting
 Lexi Randall as Anna
 Christopher Bell as Caleb
 Jon de Vries as Matthew
 Margaret Sophie Stein (Malgorzata Zajaczkowska) as Maggie
 T. Max Graham as Photographer
 Tresa Hughes as Mattie Wheaton
 James Rebhorn as William Wheaton
 Lee Richardson as Chubbers Horatio
 Lois Smith as Lou Wheaton
 Woody Watson as Jess Stearns
 Elizabeth Wilson as Harriet Wheaton

Sequel
It was followed by another sequel, Sarah, Plain and Tall: Winter's End.

Release
It aired in 1993 on CBS as a Hallmark Hall of Fame film, and now is regularly shown on Hallmark Channel.

Reception

Awards
Glenn Close was nominated for the 1993 Primetime Emmy for Outstanding Lead Actress in a Miniseries.

External links
 

1993 television films
1993 drama films
1993 films
American drama television films
1990s English-language films
Films based on children's books
Hallmark Hall of Fame episodes
Films directed by Joseph Sargent
Films scored by David Shire
Films based on American novels
American sequel films
1990s American films